The Hidden Curriculum (1970) is a book by the psychiatrist Benson R. Snyder, the then-Dean of Institute Relations at the Massachusetts Institute of Technology.  Snyder advances a thesis that much of campus conflict and students' personal anxiety is caused by unstated academic and social norms. These hidden norms affect the ability to develop independently or think creatively, and form what Snyder calls the hidden curriculum.  He illustrates his thesis with psychological studies and other research conducted at MIT and Wellesley College.

Summary
The phrase "hidden curriculum" was coined by Philip W. Jackson in his 1968 book entitled Life in Classrooms, in a section about the need for students to master the institutional expectations of school. Snyder develops this with observations of particular institutions.<ref name=ISSTL> Sending Messages:
Managing the Hidden Curriculum; second conference of the International Society for the Scholarship of Teaching and Learning (Vancouver B.C., 14–16 October 2005) "For our purposes in higher education, therefore, let us set aside most of the above line of debate, and start with Snyder (1971). Snyder's observations pre-figured all the later research on "Deep" and "Surface" learning; he noted that at MIT in the 'fifties and 'sixties, the curriculum was getting more and more crowded as technological knowledge grew, and so undergraduates were taking "short cuts" in their learning. They could not absorb everything, so they strategically tried to guess what would be assessed, for example, and revised only that. Snyder's additional insight, however, was to realise that unintentionally the Institute was teaching them to act strategically, hence the term "hidden curriculum".Read more: Hidden curriculum http://www.doceo.co.uk/tools/hidden.htm#ixzz4NwYX3Xvc   
Under Creative Commons License: Attribution Non-Commercial No Derivatives</ref>  Snyder then addresses the question of why students — even or especially the most gifted — turn away from education. Even honest efforts to enrich curricula frequently fail, says Snyder, thanks to the importance of the tacit and unwritten understanding.  He says, that while some students do not realize there is a disjunction between the two curricula, in a demanding environment, students develop strategies to cope with the requirements they face.

Many students find they can not possibly complete all the work assigned them; they learn to neglect some of it. Some student groups maintain files of past examinations, which only worsen this situation.

The difference between the formal and real requirements produced considerable dissonance among the students and resulted in cynicism, scorn, and hypocrisy among students, and particular difficulty for minority students. No part of the university community, writes Snyder, neither the professors, the administration nor the students, desires the end result created by this process.

The Saturday Review said the book "will gain recognition as one of the more cogent 'college unrest' books" and that it presents a "most provocative thesis."

The book has been cited many times in studies.

See also
Activity theory
Distributed cognition
Situated cognition

References
  Review by Alex Makowski (Tech'' article, 20 January 1971)

Curricula
Philosophy of education
Massachusetts Institute of Technology
Books about social psychology
Student culture
Books about education
1970 non-fiction books